North Carolina Highway 27 (NC 27) is a primary state highway in the U.S. state of North Carolina.

Route description

NC 27 begins in Cleveland County near the unincorporated community of Toluca at a T-intersection with NC 10. From there it runs southeast to the city of Lincolnton. In Lincolnton, it serves as Main Street, and runs past the Lincoln County courthouse. From Lincolnton, it runs southeast again to Stanley where it follows Main Street. It enters Charlotte along Mount Holly Road, and follows several major thoroughfares through Charlotte, including Freedom Drive, Morehead Street, and Independence Boulevard.

The two highways leave the city along Albemarle Road and remain joined until the unincorporated community of Johnsonville. Along this segment, they pass through the cities of Midland, Locust, Albemarle, Troy, Biscoe, and Carthage. They share further concurrencies with NC 109, NC 22, and US 15.

From the split with NC 24, the road runs northeast to Lillington where it follows Main Street, and leaves town as a concurrency with US 421. It passes Campbell University in Buies Creek before entering Johnston County and ending in Benson just short of I-95. NC 50 continues east of NC 27's terminus at US 301.

History
NC 27 is one of North Carolina's original state highways. Its original routing connected Charlotte to Lincolnton. It used several streets through Charlotte, but followed roughly the same route. The road was extended several times:
1923: east to Albemarle
1928: west to Toluca (current terminus)
1934: east to Carthage (using the concurrency with NC 24)
1948-50: east to Cameron
1958: east to Benson (current terminus)

NC 27 has had a tumultuous history through Charlotte. It has always served as a major east–west route through the city, but it has been rerouted numerous times on different city streets as traffic patterns changed. All of the following roads have carried NC 27 at one time or another:
Rozelles Ferry Rd. (1923–1936)
Mount Holly Road (1923–present)
Trade St.(1923-?)
Hawthorne Lane(1924–1936)
Central Ave.(1924–1955)
Albemarle Rd.(1924–present)
Mint St.(1936–1946)
Morehead St. (1936–present)
Thrift Rd.(1936–1946)
McDowell St. (1946–1955)
Independence Blvd. (1955–present)
Freedom Dr. (1958–Present)

Major intersections

Special routes

Lincolnton truck route

North Carolina Highway 27 Truck (NC 27 Truck) is a  route that takes truck traffic south around downtown Lincolnton, via West Highway 150 and NC 150. Signage along the route only appears at key intersections.

Thrift–Charlotte alternate route

North Carolina Highway 27A (NC 27A) was established as a renumbering of NC 271. Starting at the former community of Thrift (located in present-day Paw Creek neighborhood), it went south from Mount Holly Road, entering Charlotte along Tuckaseegee/Thrift Roads. It then overlapped with US 29/US 74/NC 20 on Morehead Street and US 74 on McDowell Street, before reconnecting with mainline NC 27 at 7th Street. In 1936, NC 27A was replaced by mainline NC 27.

Pee Dee–Wadeville alternate route

North Carolina Highway 27A (NC 27A) was established when mainline NC 27 was rerouted on a more direct route between Lake Tillery and Troy, in Montgomery County. NC 27A follows NC 73 east, through Pee Dee, then continues straight along Pee Dee Road, connecting with NC 109, in Wadeville. Going back north, it reconnected with NC 27 west from Troy. In 1967, NC 27A was decommissioned, with Pee Dee Road only section to drop to a secondary road. From Lake Tillery to Wadeville, NC 27A formed the southern edge of the Uwharrie National Forest.

See also
North Carolina Bicycle Route 5 - concurrent with NC 27 near Buies Creek
North Carolina Bicycle Route 6 - concurrent with NC 27 from Lincolnton to NC 73

References

External links

NCRoads.com: N.C. 27
NCRoads.com: N.C. 27-A

027
Transportation in Charlotte, North Carolina
Transportation in Cleveland County, North Carolina
Transportation in Lincoln County, North Carolina
Transportation in Gaston County, North Carolina
Transportation in Mecklenburg County, North Carolina
Transportation in Cabarrus County, North Carolina
Transportation in Stanly County, North Carolina
Transportation in Montgomery County, North Carolina
Transportation in Moore County, North Carolina
Transportation in Harnett County, North Carolina
Transportation in Johnston County, North Carolina